The 1996 Western Illinois Leathernecks football team represented Western Illinois University as a member of the Gateway Football Conference during the 1996 NCAA Division I-AA football season. They were led by seventh-year head coach Randy Ball and played their home games at Hanson Field. The Leathernecks finished the season with a 9–3 record overall and a 3–2 record in conference play.

Schedule

References

Western Illinois
Western Illinois Leathernecks football seasons
Western Illinois Leathernecks football